Salem Sultan Salem Saeed Al Sharji (Arabic:سالم سلطان الشارجي) (born 9 May 1993) is an Emirati footballer. He currently plays as a defender for Al-Sharjah.

External links

References

Emirati footballers
1993 births
Living people
Al Ain FC players
Al Wahda FC players
Sharjah FC players
Association football defenders
Footballers at the 2014 Asian Games
UAE Pro League players
Footballers at the 2018 Asian Games
Asian Games bronze medalists for the United Arab Emirates
Asian Games medalists in football
Medalists at the 2018 Asian Games